Gianpiero Marini (born 25 February 1951) is an Italian former professional football manager and player, who played as a midfielder. A strong and hard-working defensive midfielder, Marini played for several Italian clubs throughout his career, in particular Internazionale, where he won a Serie A title and two Coppa Italia titles during his 11 seasons with the club. At international level, he represented Italy on 20 occasions between 1980 and 1983, and was a member of the team that won the 1982 FIFA World Cup.

As a manager, Marini also coached Internazionale, where he won the UEFA Cup in 1994, as well as Como, Cremonese, and the Italy B side.

Club career
Marini was born in Lodi. Nicknamed Malik by fans, he played 256 matches in Serie A, scoring 10 goals. Throughout his career, he played for several teams, including Fanfulla, Varese, Reggina, Triestina and most notably Internazionale Milano. With Inter, he won a Serie A title ("Scudetto") during the 1979–80 season, and two Coppa Italia titles in 1978 and 1982.

International career
With Italy, Marini obtained 20 caps between 1980 and 1983, and he represented Italy in their victorious 1982 FIFA World Cup campaign, which enabled him to become a World Champion.

Style of play
Marini was known in particular for his strength, work-rate, and ability to break down plays as a defensive midfielder, as well as his powerful and accurate striking ability from distance.

Managerial career
As coach, Marini also managed Internazionale during the 1993–94, where he won the UEFA Cup in 1994, despite narrowly avoiding relegation in the league; he later also coached Como on two occasions (1997; 1999–2000), as well as Cremonese (1997–99), and the Italy B side in 2001.

Honours

Player

Club
Inter
Serie A: 1979–80
Coppa Italia: 1977–78, 1981–82

International
Italy
FIFA World Cup: 1982

Coach
Inter
UEFA Cup: 1993–94

See also
 List of UEFA Cup winning managers

References

1951 births
Living people
People from Lodi, Lombardy
UEFA Cup winning managers
Italian footballers
Italy international footballers
Association football midfielders
Serie A players
Serie B players
Reggina 1914 players
Inter Milan players
Inter Milan managers
Serie A managers
1982 FIFA World Cup players
FIFA World Cup-winning players
S.S.D. Varese Calcio players
Italian football managers
A.S.D. Fanfulla players
Footballers from Lombardy
Sportspeople from the Province of Lodi